René Teuteberg (born 5 February 1914 in Basel, Switzerland; died 12 February 2006) was a Swiss historian.

René Teuteberg, attended schools in Basel and Schiers. He then studied history at the University of Basel, where he was awarded the Dr. Phil. Afterwards he worked as a middle school teacher at the Basel Girls' School (since 1971 Diplommittelschule). Teuteberg has written numerous publications on Basle history, including a popular  overview, and has regularly held courses in this area on the subject at high school level. He also wrote six historical radio plays for Swiss radio.

Works
 Prosper de Barante (1782–1866): Ein romantischer Historiker des französischen Liberalismus, Basel 1945 (Dissertation)
 Berühmte Basler und ihre Zeit. Sieben Biographien – ein Volkshochschulkurs an der Universität Basel im Wintersemester 1976, Basel 1976
 Basler Geschichte, Basel 1986 (2. Aufl. 1988)
 Das Kloster St. Alban und die Vorstadtgesellschaft zum hohen Dolder, Basel 1992
 Wer war Jacob Burckhardt? Basel 1997
 Mitautor: Albert Oeri – 1875 bis 1950. Journalist und Politiker aus Berufung, Basel 2002.

References

1914 births
20th-century Swiss historians
2006 deaths
Writers from Basel-Stadt